LLB may refer to:

 Bachelor of Law
 Laboratoire Léon Brillouin, the national French neutron research reactor
 Lac La Biche, Alberta
 Laurence Llewelyn-Bowen, British interior designer and TV personality 
 Lemon, lime and bitters, a mixed drink common in Australia and New Zealand
 Little League Baseball, a youth sports organization in the United States
 L.L. Bean, an outdoors equipment manufacturer
 Landau–Lifshitz–Bloch equation, used in micromagnetics
 Libo Airport, IATA code LLB